Laurie Handlers (born November 27, 1947) is a Tantra educator, talk show host, and intimacy coach. She is author of the book Sex & Happiness: The Tantric Laws of Intimacy and holds workshops and seminars through her organization Butterfly Workshops, Inc. as well as through the International School of Temple Arts.

Handlers has a master's degree in education and a bachelor's degree in psychology and sociology.

Handlers has a radio talk show Sex and Happiness on BBS Radio as well as on WebTalkRadio. Handlers regards Tantra as a holistic form of healing.

Handlers has acted in several films, including Tantric Tourists.  Her film Beyond Dinner was awarded "Best Short film" at the Erotikos Film Festival in Jamaica in September 2013.

References

External links
Butterfly Workshops

1947 births
Living people
Spiritual practice
Tantra